is a Japanese manga series by Makoto Hagino. It was serialized in ASCII Media Works' Dengeki Maoh magazine from June 2017 to March 2021. Viz Media licensed the manga for release in North America and began releasing it in November 2019.

Publication
A Tropical Fish Yearns for Snow is written and illustrated by Makoto Hagino. It was serialized in ASCII Media Works' Dengeki Maoh magazine from the August 2017 issue sold on June 27, 2017, to the May 2021 issue sold on March 27, 2021. Nine tankōbon volumes were published from December 27, 2017, to June 25, 2021. Viz Media licensed the series for release in North America and began releasing it in November 2019.

Reception
In 2018, the manga ranked 10th in the print category of the Next Manga Awards.

References

External links
A Tropical Fish Yearns for Snow at Viz Media

2017 manga
ASCII Media Works manga
Comedy-drama anime and manga
Seinen manga
Viz Media manga